The following is a list of notable streets and roads in Manchester, England.

References

 
Manchester
Streets and roads